The Means House near Jonesville, South Carolina was built in 1821. Situated on an isolated 20 acres in rural Union County SC, the 2650 square foot Means House has been listed on the National Register of Historic Places since 1973.

Situated on an isolated  in Union County, South Carolina, the  Means House is an unrestored federal treasure. The house features rare Flemish bonded brick and Federal period woodwork. In 2008, the Palmetto Trust for Historic Places (a 501(c) 3 preservation organization) purchased the home in partnership with the Union County Historical Society. The house and property have been listed with the Palmetto Trust for Historic Places as being for sale for $86,798. 
 
Although Means House is located in a rural area, downtown Spartanburg and the Interstate Highway 85 corridor are within 35 minutes from the doorstep. Greenville-Spartanburg International Airport is within 50 minutes. Other nearby historic sites include Rose Hill Plantation.

References

Houses on the National Register of Historic Places in South Carolina
Georgian architecture in South Carolina
Houses in Union County, South Carolina
National Register of Historic Places in Union County, South Carolina